is a Japanese nationalized Peruvian football player. He plays for Deportivo Municipal. His preferred position is as an attacking midfielder.

Career
On 13 September 2006, he became the first Japanese goalscorer in Copa Sudamericana, scoring 1 goal for Coronel Bolognesi against Chilean club Colo-Colo. After impressive performances for Coronel Bolognesi and Deportivo Municipal, he was offered to play for Peru national team. But he refused the offer because he did not want to lose Japanese nationality. In July 2008, he joined Japanese club Kashiwa Reysol, located near his hometown, Moriya across the prefectural line.

Sawa was a Kashiwa Reysol player in the 2018 season but did never play a game for the club due to injuries. The club then announced on 11 January 2019, that the player had left the club by mutual consent.

Club statistics
Updated to 22 February 2018.

1Includes FIFA Club World Cup and Japanese Super Cup.

References

External links

Profile at Kashiwa Reysol
FIFA.com - Masakatsu Sawa: Lost in translation

1983 births
Living people
Association football people from Ibaraki Prefecture
Japanese footballers
Japanese expatriate footballers
J1 League players
J2 League players
Peruvian Segunda División players
Peruvian Primera División players
Sporting Cristal footballers
Coronel Bolognesi footballers
Deportivo Municipal footballers
Cienciano footballers
Kashiwa Reysol players
Unión Huaral footballers
Expatriate footballers in Peru
Association football midfielders